This is a list of paintings by the Welsh topographical artist John Ingleby.

The collection of watercolours established at the National Library of Wales are mostly views of North Wales.

References

Artists in Wales by Paul Joyner; c.1740-c.1851. Aberystwyth : National Library of Wales, 1997.

Ingleby, John